The 1990 ICI European Open was a professional ranking snooker tournament that took place in March 1990 at the Palais des Sports in Lyon, France.

John Parrott won the tournament, defeating Stephen Hendry 10–6 in the final.


Main draw

References

European Masters (snooker)
European Open (snooker)
European Open (snooker)
European Open (snooker)